Tony Ries Jr. (born 27 September 1939) is a South African wrestler. He competed in the men's freestyle lightweight at the 1960 Summer Olympics.

References

External links
 

1939 births
Living people
South African male sport wrestlers
Olympic wrestlers of South Africa
Wrestlers at the 1960 Summer Olympics
Sportspeople from Johannesburg
Commonwealth Games medallists in wrestling
Commonwealth Games bronze medallists for South Africa
Wrestlers at the 1958 British Empire and Commonwealth Games
Medallists at the 1958 British Empire and Commonwealth Games